Sacha Fenestraz Jules (born 28 July 1999) is a French-Argentine racing driver who is currently racing in Formula E with Nissan Formula E Team. He is the 2017 Eurocup Formula Renault 2.0 champion.

Early career

Karting
Born in France to Argentine and French  parents, but raised in Córdoba, Argentina, Fenestraz began karting in 2006 at the age of seven, partaking in events across France and Argentina.

Formula 4
In 2015, Fenestraz graduated to single-seaters. He partook in the French F4 Championship, where he claimed three victories and eleven junior victories. As a result, he finished as Junior F4 champion and vice-champion in the overall standings.

Formula Renault 2.0

In 2016, Fenestraz switched to Formula Renault 2.0 with Tech 1 Racing. He claimed his first pole position at the Monaco round, following the exclusion of former pole sitter Lando Norris, and subsequently took his first victory in the race. He followed that up with a second pole and victory at the final race at Estoril to finish fifth in the overall standings. He also claimed a victory and finished fifth in the Northern European Cup.

After testing with them in the post-season test at Estoril, Fenestraz signed with team champions Josef Kaufmann Racing for 2017. Fenestraz won the championship with a race to spare. He won seven races and had finished another eleven races on the podium position. After he became a champion he was included into the Renault Sport Academy.

FIA European Formula 3 Championship

In September 2017, Fenestraz joined Carlin for the eighth round at the Nürburgring. In 2018, he contested with the team full-time. He scored his first podium and victory of the season during the second race in Pau. He started this race from pole position and also managed to set the fastest lap of the race, but could only manage eleventh in the championship. At the Macau Grand Prix, Fenestraz came away with third in the race.

GP3 Series
Fenestraz partook in the final two rounds of the 2018 GP3 Series with Arden International.

Japanese Formula 3
After losing his backing from Renault, Fenestraz moved to Japan to contest the Japanese Formula 3 Championship with B-Max Racing with Motopark. Fighting throughout the season with TOM'S racer Ritomo Miyata, Fenestraz claimed eight wins and secured the title at Motegi with a round to spare, thus becoming the first rookie driver to win the title since Nick Cassidy in 2015.

Super Formula
In 2020, Fenestraz moved up to Super Formula with Kondō Racing. He continued to compete with Kondo Racing, but could only drive in the last three rounds given that Fenestraz had been unable to enter Japan because the government had closed its borders due to the pandemic. Fenestraz continued racing with the same team, but this time he had his best season in Super Formula, where he clinched his maiden win in Sportsland SUGO, and adding a couple of podiums to his name.

Super GT
In addition to his 2019 Japanese Formula 3 campaign, Fenestraz also partook in the GT300 class of the Super GT championship with Kondō Racing, finishing sixth overall. The following year, Fenestraz graduated to the GT500 class with Lexus rebranded Toyota Gazoo Racing replacing Kazuki Nakajima at TGR TOM'S au and partnering Yuhi Sekiguchi. Four podiums to his name alongside Sekiguchi placed 4th in the standings. Fenestraz stayed with the same team, but nmove to the KeePer car pairing up with Ryo Hirakawa. Unfortunately he was denied entry to Japan for long time due to border restriction caused by the pandemic. He raced in the fifth round of the series, and by end of season clinched 1 podium. He continues to compete same team, but with new teammate of Ritomo Miyata. In that season, Fenestraz and Miyata clinched their GT500 maiden win in Fuji Speedway.

Formula E
In February 2020, Fenestraz was named as one of Panasonic Jaguar Racing's entrants into the rookie test in Marrakesh. In the test, Fenestraz set the fourth fastest time of the morning session and finish tenth overall in the afternoon session and overall classification. The following year, Fenestraz was named as Jaguar's reserve driver for the 2021 season opener at Riyadh.

Dragon / Penske Autosport (2022)

2021–22 season
In August 2022, Fenestraz made his Formula E debut in the second Seoul ePrix, replacing Antonio Giovinazzi who suffered a hand injury in the previous race.

Nissan Formula E Team (2023–)

2022–23 season
Fenestraz entered into Formula E on a full-time basis for the 2023 season, partnering Norman Nato at Nissan. The year began promisingly, with the Frenchman getting into the knockout stage of qualifying for the season-opening Mexico City ePrix, although he would fall back during the race. At the next event in Diriyah, Fenestraz scored his first points in the series with an eighth place in the second race, which he stated he was "pleased" about. The French driver qualified in fourth for the Hyderabad ePrix two weeks later, but would miss out on a chance at points after becoming stuck between the two Jaguar Racing cars, which had crashed just in front of Fenestraz. During the following round in Cape Town, Fenestraz took his maiden pole position in the series, beating Maximilian Günther in the final stage and setting the fastest ever Formula E lap in the process. During the race however, Fenestraz fell down to third before being collided into by Nick Cassidy on the final lap, hitting the barriers which would result in a 14th-placed finish.

Personal life

Fenestraz shared a flat in Guildford with fellow racing driver Lando Norris.

Racing record

Career summary

† As Fenestraz was a guest driver, he was ineligible to score points.

Complete French F4 Championship results
(key) (Races in bold indicate pole position) (Races in italics indicate fastest lap)

Complete Formula Renault Eurocup results
(key) (Races in bold indicate pole position) (Races in italics indicate fastest lap)

Complete FIA Formula 3 European Championship results
(key) (Races in bold indicate pole position) (Races in italics indicate fastest lap)

† Driver did not finish the race, but was classified as he completed over 90% of the race distance.

Complete Macau Grand Prix results

Complete GP3 Series results
(key) (Races in bold indicate pole position) (Races in italics indicate fastest lap)

Complete Japanese Formula 3 Championship results 
(key) (Races in bold indicate pole position) (Races in italics indicate fastest lap)

Complete Super GT results
(key) (Races in bold indicate pole position; races in italics indicate fastest lap)

‡ Half points awarded as less than 75% of race distance was completed.

Complete Super Formula results
(key) (Races in bold indicate pole position) (Races in italics indicate fastest lap)

Complete Formula E results
(key) (Races in bold indicate pole position; races in italics indicate fastest lap)

Notes

References

External links

1999 births
Living people
French racing drivers
French F4 Championship drivers
Formula Renault Eurocup drivers
Formula Renault 2.0 NEC drivers
FIA Formula 3 European Championship drivers
French people of Argentine descent
Sportspeople of Argentine descent
French people of Colombian descent
Sportspeople of Colombian descent
French GP3 Series drivers
Japanese Formula 3 Championship drivers
Super Formula drivers
Carlin racing drivers
Arden International drivers
Super GT drivers
Toyota Gazoo Racing drivers
TOM'S drivers
Motopark Academy drivers
Tech 1 Racing drivers
Josef Kaufmann Racing drivers
Auto Sport Academy drivers
Kondō Racing drivers
Formula E drivers
Dragon Racing drivers
Súper TC 2000 drivers
Nismo drivers
Michelin Pilot Challenge drivers
French expatriate sportspeople in England
Argentine racing drivers
Argentine people of Colombian descent
B-Max Racing drivers